Dibble is a town in McClain County, Oklahoma, United States. The population within city limits was 878 at the 2010 census. The community has 8,868 residents in its 73031 zipcode, according to Sperling's Best Places. Dibble is in the outer suburban area west of Purcell and southwest of Norman, in the Oklahoma City Metropolitan Area, according to the U.S. Census.

Geography
Dibble is located at  (35.040060, -97.639805).

Dibble is located along State Highway 39 just east of the State Highway 76 junction.

History
Dibble was incorporated in 1937.

In 1950 Dibble had a population of 148.

The town's school system was first established in 1907

Located in western McClain County, Dibble lies just north of State Highway 39 and approximately one mile east of State Highway 76. For much of the nineteenth century the site of the present community existed in the Chickasaw Nation's Pontotoc County. According to historian George Shirk, John and James Dibble operated a ranch in the area and contributed their name to the town. The town is also located near Dibble Creek. The ranch lay on the Fort Smith to Fort Sill military road and served as a stopping point for soldiers and travelers. The village may have been in existence as early as 1869, and the Post Office Department designated a Dibble post office in 1894 with Horatio Orem as postmaster.

In 1901 the Gazetteer and Business Directory of Indian Territory reported that Dibble had one hundred residents, a hotel, a grocery store, a general store, a blacksmith, a doctor, and three stockmen. Ranching served as the early economic staple, soon followed by farming. In 1902 J. T. Payne platted the townsite, which the Department of Interior approved in November of that year, withholding the land from the Chickasaw allotment process. In 1906, after the Oklahoma Central Railway failed to build through the town, placing its tracks eight miles north at Blanchard, the town lost many of its burgeoning businesses. In 1911 Polk's Oklahoma Gazetteer estimated a Dibble population of 150 and listed two general stores, a confectioner, a blacksmith, a doctor, and a drugstore. In 1918 the population dropped to 125, but the town had added a gristmill, a cotton gin, and a feed store, reflecting the emphasis on farming.

In 1926 the post office discontinued. In 1936 the Works Progress Administration built an addition to the school, which educated children from the surrounding region. In 1937 State Highway 39 was completed adjacent to the community, allowing the school district to annex outlying rural schools. Also in 1937 the town incorporated, and in 1940 the population stood at 97. The school, area petroleum drilling, and agriculture supported Dibble for much of the twentieth century. In 1953 another post office began operation. The 1960 population was 127, climbing to 184 in 1970. In 1990 the town had 181 residents, which rose to 289 in 2000. That year there were 568 students enrolled in the Dibble School District. By 2010 the town had bloomed to 878 residents.

Demographics

As of the census of 2000, there were 289 people, 111 households, and 84 families residing in the town. There were 120 housing units at an average density of 45.1 per square mile (17.4/km2). The racial makeup of the town was 88.93% White, 5.88% Native American, and 5.19% from two or more races. Hispanic or Latino of any race were 1.38% of the population.

There were 111 households, out of which 36.0% had children under the age of 18 living with them, 58.6% were married couples living together, 11.7% had a female householder with no husband present, and 24.3% were non-families. 20.7% of all households were made up of individuals, and 4.5% had someone living alone who was 65 years of age or older. The average household size was 2.60 and the average family size was 3.00.

In the town, the population was spread out, with 28.0% under the age of 18, 8.0% from 18 to 24, 29.1% from 25 to 44, 26.0% from 45 to 64, and 9.0% who were 65 years of age or older. The median age was 36 years. For every 100 females, there were 87.7 males. For every 100 females age 18 and over, there were 100.0 males.

The median income for a household in the town was $30,781, and the median income for a family was $35,000. Males had a median income of $30,000 versus $14,286 for females. The per capita income for the town was $16,609. About 10.6% of families and 10.1% of the population were below the poverty line, including 9.6% of those under the age of eighteen and 7.0% of those 65 or over.

References

External links
 Encyclopedia of Oklahoma History and Culture - Dibble 

Towns in McClain County, Oklahoma
Towns in Oklahoma